Camaret-sur-Aigues (literally Camaret on Aigues) is a commune in the Vaucluse department in the Provence-Alpes-Côte d'Azur region in southeastern France.

Twin towns
Camaret-sur-Aigues is twinned with Travacò Siccomario, Italy.

See also
Communes of the Vaucluse department

References

Communes of Vaucluse